Why I Am Not a Muslim, a book written by Ibn Warraq, is a critique of Islam and the Qur'an. It was first published by Prometheus Books in the United States in 1995. The title of the book is a homage to Bertrand Russell's essay, Why I Am Not a Christian, in which Russell criticizes the religion in which he was raised.

Motive, contents and reviews 
Outraged over the fatwa and death threats against Salman Rushdie, Ibn Warraq assumes a pseudonym to write what the historian and writer Daniel Pipes called "serious and thought-provoking book" using a "scholarly sledgehammer" approach to "demolish" Islam. Warraq claims the work is his contribution ('my war effort') in the struggle against the kinds of people who would want to murder Rushdie.

The author's "polemic" criticizes Islam's mythology, theology, historic achievements, and current cultural influence. Warraq, drawing largely on previous research, provides what English philosopher Antony Flew called an "invaluable compilation" of Islam's shortcomings. Flew wrote that the book "makes a compelling case" that Islam is "flatly incompatible" with "individual rights and liberties of a modern liberal, democratic, secular state". According to Warraq, one either has to believe that the Qur'an is the word of God, or that Muhammad was a liar. Moreover, progress made in modern critical scholarship of the Bible has serious and possibly detrimental consequences for belief in the inerrancy of the Qur'an once it is subjected to the same type of scholarly criticism.

Dutch Arabist Hans Jansen noted that 'it is remarkable that in this first book, Ibn Warraq makes no distinction at all between 'normal' Islam and Islamic fundamentalism. Both oppose the freedom of expression with all their might.' Jansen wondered whether the criticism of Islam that Warraq, Rushdie and other British–Indian writers such as V.S. Naipaul and Arun Shourie displayed was perhaps so 'ruthless' – compared to the much milder approach commonly adopted by Judaeo-Christian writers – because of vestiges of 'Hindu prejudices', or because these authors felt no inhibition to scrutinise a fellow Abrahamic religion.

See also 
 Apostasy in Islam
 Criticism of Islam
 Leaving Islam: Apostates Speak Out

Editions
 Prometheus Books (hardcover), 1995, 
 (French) Age d'homme, (1999), 
 (Persian), 2000
 Prometheus Books (paperback), 2003, 
 (Spanish) Ediciones del Bronce, Barcelona, 2003 
 (Danish) Lindhardt og Ringhof, 2004,

References

External links
Review Review by Daniel Pipes
Review Review by Taslima Nasrin

1995 non-fiction books
Books about atheism
Books critical of Islam
Non-fiction books about jihadism
Prometheus Books books
Works published under a pseudonym